Charles Fraser (August 20, 1782 – October 5, 1860), was an American artist best known for his miniatures of prominent American figures.

Early life
Charles Fraser was born at Charleston, South Carolina in 1782.  His parents died when he was nine years old and thereafter, he was raised by his older brother, Frederick Fraser.  He studied law and practiced until 1818, but afterwards devoted himself to art. He attended the classical academy of Bishop Robert Smith in Charleston along with Thomas Sully.

Career
At various points in his career, he was associated with Washington Allston and John Stevens Cogdell.  In 1806, he visited Newport, Rhode Island where he met up with John Trumbull and Gilbert Stuart.

In 1825, he painted a portrait of Marquis de Lafayette.  His talent was very diversified, and in 1857, at an exhibition of his works at Charleston, there were shown 313 miniatures and 139 landscapes and other pieces by him. He was also a frequent orator in Charleston.  For instance, he delivered the dedication address at Magnolia Cemetery in 1850.  He also delivered an address on the dedication of a new building on the College of Charleston campus in 1828.

In 1830, he was elected into the National Academy of Design as an Honorary Academician, and elected a member of the American Antiquarian Society in 1834.

Fraser died at Charleston in 1860.

Gallery

Notes

References

 

1782 births
1860 deaths
18th-century American painters
18th-century American male artists
American male painters
19th-century American painters
Portrait miniaturists
Artists from Charleston, South Carolina
Painters from South Carolina
American portrait painters
Members of the American Antiquarian Society
19th-century American male artists